Space Dandy is an anime television series produced by Bones. The series is directed by Shingo Natsume, with Shinichirō Watanabe serving as general director. The series follows the misadventures of Dandy, an alien hunter who is "a dandy guy in space", in search for undiscovered and rare aliens with his robot assistant QT and his feline-like friend named Meow.

The anime began airing on Adult Swim's Toonami programming block in North America on January 4, 2014, one day before its Japanese premiere on Tokyo MX on January 5, 2014. The anime has been licensed by Funimation in North America, Madman Entertainment in Australia, and Anime Limited in the United Kingdom. In Japan, the series was collected in both DVD and Blu-ray format starting on April 25, 2014.

The series' opening theme is  performed by Yasuyuki Okamura and the ending theme up through episode 19 is  performed by Etsuko Yakushimaru. Starting with episode 20, unique ending themes are used each week. Episode 20's ending theme is  performed by DROPKIX (vocals by Junichi Suwabe). Episode 21 used "WHITE HOUSE" composed and arranged by Ogre You Asshole. Episode 22 featured  performed by ZEN-LA-ROCK featuring Yomeiri Land. Episode 23 featured "Seaside Driving" composed and arranged by Seiichi Nagai of Sōtaisei Riron.

The English version was produced by Funimation in Fort Worth, Texas using its local acting talent pool. The series' ADR voice directors include Zach Bolton and Joel McDonald. The series was also simulcasted at the same time as Japan by Animax Asia in South East Asia with both Japanese and English audio.

Episode list

Season 1 (2014)

Season 2 (2014)

Notes

References

Space Dandy